La Madrastra (English: The Stepmother) is a Mexican telenovela. It was produced by Televisa and broadcast on Canal de las Estrellas in Mexico from Monday, February 7, 2005 through Friday, July 29, 2005. The program became an unexpected success, garnering ratings in excess of 30 points. Starring Victoria Ruffo and César Évora, who last appeared together in 2000's Abrázame muy fuerte, along with Eduardo Capetillo, Jacqueline Andere, Ana Martín, Cecilia Gabriela, Martha Julia, Guillermo García Cantú, René Casados and Sabine Moussier, La madrastra tells the story of María, a woman who lost twenty years of her life after being falsely accused of murder and who returns to Mexico to exact revenge on her husband and friends who abandoned her and to see her beloved children once more.

La Madrastra is fourth in a series of remakes of the 1981 Chilean production of the same name. The program aired five nights a week, Monday through Friday, at 9 pm for 25 weeks. A follow-up special, La madrastra: años después, aired shortly after the finale on Saturday, July 30, 2005.

From June 15 to August 21, 2015 Canal de las Estrellas broadcast reruns 12:00 replacing Rubí with Hasta que el dinero nos separe replacing it on August 24.

Plot
A terrible tragedy puts an end to a group of friends' vacation in Aruba. María (Victoria Ruffo) hears a gunshot and finds her friend Patricia (Montserrat Olivier) dead; in the confusion of the moment, she picks up the gun. María is thus found guilty of murder and is sentenced to life in jail. Her husband, Esteban (César Évora), an important businessman, does not believe her proclamations of innocence, and when he returns to Mexico he divorces her, buys the silence of all who were with them on the trip, and tells his young children that their mother died in an accident. He then erects a painting of another woman, whom he names Montserrat, above the fireplace

Twenty years later, María is freed from prison as a result of her good conduct and returns to Mexico City in search of vengeance. She wants to find Patricia's real killer and confront Esteban, whom she now hates for abandoning her, but what she wishes for most is to have her children, Héctor (Mauricio Aspe) and Estrella (Ana Layevska), back. The first thing that María does when she arrives is to confront everyone who was with her on the trip: Esteban; Servando (Lorenzo de Rodas), one of Esteban's business associates at the Empresas San Román; Demetrio (Guillermo García Cantú), Esteban's corporate lawyer; Daniela (Cecilia Gabriela), Demetrio's wife and the aunt of Esteban's fiancée, Ana Rosa (Martha Julia); Bruno (René Casados), another of Esteban's business associates; Fabiola (Sabine Moussier), Bruno's wife who is nonetheless in love with Esteban; and Alba (Jacqueline Andere) and Carmela (Margarita Isabel), Esteban's two aunts. Everyone is horrified to see María, and she puts fear and doubt into them when she tells them that she did not kill Patricia, and that the real murderer has lived among them for the past twenty years.

In the course of her investigation, María finds a portion of Patricia's diary and learns that her friend was not the good person whom she appeared to be: Patricia knew the secrets and weaknesses of everyone in their group and purposefully made María believe that Esteban had made sexual advances toward her. Furthermore, María learns that Patricia never loved her own son, Leonel (Eduardo Capetillo), and María resolves to prevent Leonel from learning this terrible truth.

María remarries Esteban so that she can win back her children's love; however, Héctor and Estrella are unaware that María is their real mother and loathe her, believing that María has come to usurp the rightful place of their mother, whom they have idealized. Plus, María must deal with the intrigues of her former friends, most notably Alba, who secretly harbors an incestuous love for her own nephew and hates all of the women who grow close to him, and Fabiola, who was once engaged to Esteban and resents María for winning his heart despite her low socioeconomic background.

María is also stunned to learn that Esteban has a third child, Ángel (Miguel Ángel Biaggio), whose mother Esteban refuses to name. Ángel is a frequently ill and insecure young man, and María accepts him immediately and treats him with love, and vice versa. Thanks to María's support, Ángel grows into a self-confident and optimistic man. Little by little, María wins her own children's love without revealing the true ties that unite them. She helps Estrella to mature and leave behind her life as a superficial and capricious youth, and helps her to understand that of her two suitors, Carlos (Sergio Mayer) and Greco (José Luis Reséndez), it is the latter who truly cares for her. Héctor is also immature and arrogant, and María helps him to accept responsibility when he falls in love with and impregnates Vivian (Michelle Vieth), María's former cellmate.

However, María's biggest problem is Esteban. María finds herself at a crossroads when she realizes that she still loves her husband, and that he still loves her. Now, with her heart hardened by twenty years of suffering, loneliness, and abandonment, María must find the strength to choose between vengeance and forgiveness.

Alternate ending
Two endings to the novela currently exist: following the original airing in 2005, La madrastra had a rerun in 2007 in the 6pm time slot on Televisa. Producer Salvador Mejía Alejandre arranged to reunite most of the cast in order to re-film the ending so that viewers could once again eagerly anticipate discovering the killer's identity. The two versions thus diverge at the point when Esteban is let out of prison after the Aruban authorities discover the killer's identity, though some new scenes were added in earlier episodes. A notable difference is that the first version consists of 120 one-hour episodes, but the second version was compressed into 115. Many scenes from the original broadcast were either edited out or tweaked during the second broadcast, such as the deaths of Ana Rosa, Carlos, Alba, Rebecca, and Servando.

In the original ending, Demetrio is revealed to be Patricia's murderer immediately after he shoots Ana Rosa in the abandoned warehouse; it is also revealed that Demetrio is a crossdresser, and that he was able to cast suspicion on his wife, Daniela, because he committed the murders while wearing her clothing and a hairpiece identical to hers. Demetrio is soon seen to be slightly unhinged, and he sets out to murder Esteban, Bruno, Fabiola, and Carmela for having abandoned him after claiming to be his friends. He is ultimately arrested after attempting to kill María in the final episode, and he is sent to prison, where it is strongly implied that he is raped by the other inmates.

In the alternate ending, the killer is not revealed to the audience until the penultimate episode, at which point Bruno discovers the videotape of Fabiola murdering Patricia. In a fit of insanity, Fabiola stabs Bruno to death and then psychotically runs through the streets of Mexico City, alternately searching for María and hiding behind lampposts. She eventually corners María in the San Román home with a gun, but the police arrive and she is arrested and sent to a mental institution. In this version Demetrio has a happy ending in which he is reunited with Ángel and Carmela at Alma (Ximena Herrera) and Ángel's wedding; in the original version Fabiola, too, has a happy ending in which she and Bruno abandon their glamorous personalities and devote themselves to one another.

The alternate ending has only ever aired in Mexico; the 2009 re-run of La madrastra on Telefutura in the United States used the original ending in which Demetrio is the killer. The DVD set of La madrastra, which was released in 2006, also features the Demetrio ending. Furthermore, there exists no alternate version of the follow-up special to the novela, Años después, for the Fabiola ending; Demetrio is Patricia's killer in this special.

Años Después
A follow-up special to La madrastra entitled La madrastra: años después (English: The Stepmother: Years Later) aired on El Canal de las Estrellas on Saturday, July 30, 2005, the day after the series finale. Set ten years after the finale's quintuple wedding, the special portrays the happily reunited San Román family, including four new grandchildren, as well as the Xochimilco residents (reformed villains Bruno, Fabiola, and Daniela do not appear in the special; Daniela is said to have happily married an older man, while Bruno and Fabiola have devoted themselves to helping sick children). The San Románs go to Patricia's lake cabin in order to celebrate their shared ten-year wedding anniversary, unaware that Demetrio, whom they believe died after escaping from prison a year prior, is actually alive and well and is conspiring with his grandson, Ángel and Alma (Ximena Herrera)'s young son Angelito, and the San Román grandchildren's nanny, Diana, to kill the entire family.  After numerous failed plots to kill his family members, Angelito lures María to a shack in the woods where Demetrio is holding Estrella hostage. Esteban comes to their rescue, but while fighting with Demetrio a candle is knocked over and sets the structure on fire, killing Demetrio and Diana. Angelito is left near death after the event, but María's prayers to the Virgin Mary save the child, and his grandmother gives him the silver figurine of the Virgin that she made in prison in order to remind him to always be good.

Cast

Main

 Victoria Ruffo - María Fernández Acuña de San Román
 César Évora - Esteban San Román
 Eduardo Capetillo - Leonel Ibáñez
 Jacqueline Andere - Alba San Román
 Ana Martín - Socorro de Montes
 Cecilia Gabriela - Daniela Márquez ex de Rivero
 Martha Julia - Ana Rosa Márquez / Sofía Márquez
 Guillermo García Cantú - Demetrio Rivero
 René Casados - Bruno Mendizábal
 Sabine Moussier - Fabiola Morán de Mendizabal

Also main

 Margarita Isabel - Carmela San Román
 Lorenzo de Rodas - Servando Maldonado
 Patricia Reyes Spíndola - Venturina García "La Muda"
 Joaquín Cordero - Padre Belisario
 Michelle Vieth - Vivian Sousa de San Román
 Ana Layevska - Estrella San Román Fernandez de Montes
 Sergio Mayer - Carlos Sánchez
 Mauricio Aspe - Héctor San Román Fernandez 
 Mariana Ríos - Guadalupe "Lupita" Montes de Ibáñez 
 Miguel Ángel Biaggio - Ángel San Román / Ángel Rivero San Román
 Ximena Herrera - Alma Martínez de San Román
 José Luis Reséndez - Greco Montes
 Carlos Bonavides - Rufino "El Pulpo" Sánchez
 Arturo García Tenorio - Leonardo "Da Vinci" Montes
 Liza Willert - Rebeca Robles
 Marcial Casale - Mañas
 Arturo Muñoz - El Panteón
 Rubén Morales - Detective Figueroa
 Irma Serrano - La Duquesa

Special participation

 María Luisa Alcalá - Fanny
 Mariana Karr - Prison guard
 Mario Casillas - Dr. René Rubén
 Montserrat Oliver - Patricia de Ibáñez
 Archie Lanfranco - Lic. Luciano Cerezuela
 Óscar Morelli - Director of Jail
 Sergio Jurado - Investigator Muñoz
 Alejandra Barros - Diana
 Laura Pausini - to herself

Broadcast history
La madrastra premiered on Televisa's El Canal de las Estrellas (XEW-TV) on Monday, February 7, 2005 at 9:00 PM, replacing Mujer de madera. The program aired weeknights at this time for one hour until Friday, July 15, 2005, when the telenovela was originally scheduled to end after a 115-episode run. However, after La madrastra became such a ratings success, Televisa ordered an additional ten episodes, bringing the episode total to 125. These final episodes were reduced from the normal hour length to thirty minutes each, ceding the latter portion of the hour to La esposa virgen. The series finale aired on Friday, July 29, 2005, with the Años después special airing the following evening. It aired on Univision Monday March 21, 2005, 9pm/8c replacing Amor Real. The last episode was broadcast Monday September 5, 2005, with La esposa virgen replacing it. The novela was then replaced with La esposa virgen, which expanded to take up the entire hour. Televisa later re-aired the program, with a new ending, in 2007.

Prior versions
La madrastra is a remake and is the fifth version of this telenovela to be broadcast. The four previous versions are:
La madrastra (1981), produced by Canal 13 in Chile, with Jael Unger and Walter Kliche.
Vivir un poco (English: To Live a Little; 1985), produced by Televisa in Mexico, with Angélica Aragón and Rogelio Guerra.
Para toda la vida (English: For All of Life; 1996), produced by Televisa in Mexico in conjunction with Megavisión in Chile, with Ofelia Medina and Ezequiel Lavandero.
Forever (1996), produced by Fox Television in the United States in conjunction with Televisa, with Maria Mayenzet and James Richer.

DVD release
La madrastra was released to region 1 DVD on 21 March 2006. The series was considerably abridged in order to fit on the three double-sided DVD set, which contains 710 minutes of material. In addition to the abridged novela, the release also features the post-finale Años después special, as well as the original trailer for the novela, bloopers, and promotional photographs. The DVD release also has optional English subtitles.

In popular culture
La madrastra was featured in Mexican sketch comedy show La Parodia, which spoofed the program in a parody called La madre ésta. The character of María was portrayed by Gaby Ruffo, younger sister of Victoria Ruffo, who plays María in the novela.

The telenovela gained notice in the English-speaking United States in 2005 after being featured on numerous episodes of E! network's The Soup. Host Joel McHale often singled out Bruno for the amount of eyeliner that the character wore and "that bitch Alba" for what McHale described as her "crazy eye" that appeared to bulge noticeably larger than the other during particularly intense scenes. The Soup also mocked particular scenes of the novela, such as when Alba poisoned Rebeca with rat poison, causing the latter to flail and foam at the mouth before dramatically dying on the floor. McHale at one point emphatically stated that "I can think of fifteen network shows I understand that aren't this good!"

Awards and nominations

2006 TVyNovelas Awards

2006 Bravo Awards

2006 ACE Awards

2010 Tv Adicto Golden Awards

2020 TLN Awards

References

External links 
 

2005 telenovelas
2005 Mexican television series debuts
2005 Mexican television series endings
Mexican telenovelas
Televisa telenovelas
Mexican television series based on Chilean television series
Spanish-language telenovelas